Bradley Michael Ferguson (born 1953) is a journalist and science fiction writer. He writes as Brad Ferguson.

Life
Ferguson is married to scientist Kathi Ferguson, with whom he collaborated on one novel.

Literary works
Ferguson has worked as a writer, editor and producer for CBS Radio News in New York. He is the author of a number of Star Trek tie-in novels, several short stories, and the post-holocaust novel The World Next Door. He served a three-year term as eastern regional director of the Science Fiction and Fantasy Writers of America (SFWA), starting in 1999.

Bibliography

Novels

Star Trek tie-ins
Crisis on Centaurus (1986)
A Flag Full of Stars (1991)
Star Trek, the Next Generation: The Last Stand (1995)
Star Trek : Starfleet Academy 13. The Haunted Starship (with Kathi Ferguson) (1997)

Other novels
The World Next Door (1990)

Short stories
"Last Rights" (Analog, Nov. 1988)
"Rhuum Service" (Hotel Andromeda, edited by Jack L. Chalker, 1994)
"To Tell the Troof" (Fantasy & Science Fiction, Jan. 1989)
"The World Next Door" (Isaac Asimov's Science Fiction Magazine, Sep. 1987)

References

External links
Bibliography

1953 births
Living people
American science fiction writers
Xavier High School (New York City) alumni
Fordham University alumni
20th-century American novelists
American male novelists
20th-century American male writers